The Compania de Transport Public (CTP) Iași (English: Iași Public Transport Company) is the major transit operator responsible for public transportation in Iași, Romania. Until September 2016, CTP was known as the Autonomous Public Transport Operator of Iași (Romanian: Regia Autonomă de Transport Public (RATP) Iași).

History
Established on 19 March 1898, CTP Iași operates an extensive network using metre gauge trams (electric trams began operating in 1900) and buses.

The Iași city is partly built on hills, and the tram network reaches, on certain portions, large slopes. The steepest grade on the entire tram system is 8.8 percent, on the line between Târgu Cucu and the intersection with Tudor Vladimirescu Blvd. (Cinci Drumuri-Pădurii) towards the Tatărași neighbourhood, one of the steepest gradients on adhesion railways in Europe.

Routes
In 2014, the CTP carried 50,358,000 passengers, an average of 140,000 passengers per day.

Tram routes

Bus routes

Fares
The CTP fare system accepts tickets, transit passes and card payments (either direct or through a smartphone application). 
As of January 2023, adult cash fares are RON3.00 (€0.61) for 120 minutes inside 1st zone, RON4.00 (€0.81) inside 1st and 2nd zones, or RON2.75 (€0.56) for a single trip inside 1st zone when purchasing in sets of 20 trips each. Adult passes are available for 30-day all routes at RON110,00 (€22.28) inside 1st zone, RON40 (€8.10) inside 2nd zone, or RON150 (€30.38) for both zones. More options are available, including different types of discounts.

Ticket vending machines are also available at some stations. In 2018, the payment options were modernized and paying through an app was made possible - by using a third-party application and scanning QR codes that are available in multiple points in the vehicles and on the side of ticket kiosks in most stations. After a few months, most vehicles have been equipped to also support contactless card payments.

Rolling stock
Historically, tram cars from different companies have been acquired. The current fleet operates with 126 trams.

Current vehicles

Retired vehicles

Bus fleet
CTP Iași operates a fleet of 140 transit buses and 10 minibuses.

Current fleet

Minibuses

Retired bus fleet

Retired trolleybus fleet

See also
List of town tramway systems in Romania
List of tram and light rail transit systems

References

External links

CTP Iași official website
former RATP official site
Tram Travels: Compania de Transport Public Iași (CTP)
pics about the trams in Iaşi at public-transport.net

Iasi
Iasi
Transport in Iași
Metre gauge railways in Romania
1898 establishments in Romania
Companies based in Iași